Jason Marshall (born 5 February 1985) is a Canadian rugby union player. His position is tighthead prop, and he has played 27 tests for the Canadian national team. Marshall currently plays for La Rochelle in the Rugby Pro D2. Marshall had previously played rugby in the British Columbia Premiership with Capilano RFC and James Bay Athletic Association, BC Bears in the Canadian Rugby Championship, and Stade Aurillacois Cantal Auvergne in the Rugby Pro D2.

Marshall originally had aspirations of becoming a professional football player as he played as a quarterback with Simon Fraser University and eventually tried out for the Edmonton Eskimos of the Canadian Football League. After being cut from the Eskimos Marshall focused on rugby eventually making the Canadian national senior team in 2008.

Marshall competed for Canada at the 2011 Rugby World Cup starting at tighthead prop in all four of Canada's pool matches.

References

External links 
 

1985 births
Canadian rugby union players
Canada international rugby union players
Living people
Canadian expatriate rugby union players
Canadian expatriate sportspeople in France
Canadian expatriate sportspeople in New Zealand
Expatriate rugby union players in France
Expatriate rugby union players in New Zealand
Rugby union props
Sportspeople from North Vancouver
Hawke's Bay rugby union players
Stade Rochelais players